Marie Hall Ets (December 16, 1895 in Milwaukee, Wisconsin – January 17, 1984 in Inverness, Florida) was an American writer and illustrator who is best known for children's picture books. She attended Lawrence College, and in 1918, Ets journeyed to Chicago where she became a social worker at the Chicago Commons, a settlement house on the northwest side of the city. There she met Ines Cassettari, an immigrant from Italy who worked at the settlement. Ets transcribed Cassettari's autobiography, and the book was later published as Rosa: The Life of an Italian Immigrant.

In 1960 Ets won the annual Caldecott Medal for her illustrations of Nine Days to Christmas, whose text she wrote with Aurora Labastida. She died in 1984. Just Me and In the Forest are both Caldecott Honor books. The black-and-white charcoal illustrations in Just Me "almost take on the appearance of woodcuts" and are similar in style to the illustrations in In the Forest. Constantine Georgiou comments in Children and Their Literature that Ets' "picture stories and easy-to-read books" (along with those of Maurice Sendak) "are filled with endearing and quaint human touches, putting them at precisely the right angle to life in early childhood." Play With Me, says Georgiou, is "a tender little tale, delicately illustrated in fragile pastels that echo the quiet mood of the story."

Works

  Mister Penny (Viking Press, 1935)
  The Story of a Baby, 1939
  In the Forest, 1944 ‡
  My Dog Rinty, 1946, by Ellen Terry
  Oley, the Sea monster, 1947
  Little Old Automobile, 1948
  Mr. T. W. Anthony Woo: the story of a cat and a dog and a mouse, 1951 ‡
  Beasts and Nonsense, 1952
  Another Day, 1953
  Play With Me, 1955 ‡
  Mister Penny's Race Horse, 1956 ‡
Cow's Party, 1958
  Nine Days to Christmas' (Viking, 1959), text by Ets and Aurora Labastida ‡
  Mister Penny's Circus, 1961
  Gilberto and the Wind, 1963
  Automobiles for Mice, 1964
  Just Me, 1965 ‡
  Bad Boy, Good Boy, 1967
  Talking Without Words: I Can. Can You?, 1968
  Rosa, the Life of an Italian Immigrant (transcribed by Ets), 1970
  Elephant in a Well, 1972
  Jay Bird, 1974

‡ As an illustrator Ets won the annual Caldecott Medal in 1960 for Nine Days to Christmas'' and she was one of the runners-up five times from 1945 to 1966 (exceeded only by Maurice Sendak). Since 1971 the runners-up are called Caldecott Honor Books, but some runners-up had been identified annually and all those runners-up were retroactively named Caldecott Honor Books. The number of Honors or runners-up had always been one to five, and it had been two to four since 1994, until five were named in 2013 and six in 2015. The Honor Books must be a subset of the runners-up on the final ballot, either the leading runners-up on that ballot or the leaders on one further ballot that excludes the winner.

References

 

1895 births
1984 deaths
American children's writers
American women illustrators
Caldecott Medal winners
American children's book illustrators
Writers from Wisconsin
20th-century American women artists